Order of Nasr (meaning Divine Support) is a military award of Iranian armed forces which is awarded by Commander-in-chief, Supreme Leader of Iran to recognize distinguished logistics contribution and support of the troops.

Recipients 

 Alireza Afshar
 Javad Azimifar
 Mohammad Bagheri
 Mohsen Fakhrizadeh (1st Class)
 Valiollah Fallahi
 Hassan Firouzabadi (1st class)
 Mohammad Hossein Jalali
 Mousa Namjoo
 Mohsen Rafighdoost
 Hassan Rouhani (1st class)
 Mohammad Salimi
 Qasem-Ali Zahirnejad

References 

Military awards and decorations of Iran
Military logistics